Treglio is a municipality and town in the Province of Chieti in the Abruzzo region of Italy

References

Cities and towns in Abruzzo